are theme restaurants and pubs that originated in Akihabara, Tokyo, Japan, around the late 1990s and early 2000s. The staff treat the customers as masters and mistresses in a private home rather than merely as café customers. Such restaurants and cafés have quickly become a staple of Japanese otaku culture.

The popularity of cosplay restaurants and maid cafes has spread to other regions in Japan, such as Osaka's Den Den Town as well as to places outside Japan, such as Hong Kong, Taiwan, Singapore, Mexico, Canada, and the Philippines.

Characteristics

Maid café 

Upon entering one of such stores, the customer is greeted with the customary , offered a wipe towel and shown a food/drink menu. Popular dishes include cakes (sometimes baked by the maids themselves), ice-cream, omurice, spaghetti, as well as drinks such as Coca-Cola, tea, milk or alcoholic beverages such as beer or, in some cases, even champagne. Other options (of service) include taking polaroid pictures (either of the maid alone, together with another maid or with the customer, which are then decorated using colored markers or stickers), playing card, video games, and/or even slightly more unusual ones, such as being slapped by one or more of the maids.

There exists a wide range of establishments catering to specific tastes and offering different services to customers. Recently, with the maid cafe scene booming, additional related services have become popular. These include , a foot or hand massage, photography sessions (the customer typically rents time in a studio during which he can tell a maid which costume to wear and how to pose) or even "dates" with maids. With the popularity of maid cafes, a number of other businesses have followed. Within Akihabara alone one can find several legitimate massage parlors, a maid eyeglass store, and at least one cosplay/maid izakaya.

Butler café 

The butlers in these cafes are well-dressed male employees and may wear either a typical waiter's uniform or even a tuxedo or tails. One butler cafe has its waiters cosplay as teenage schoolboys, in an effort to appeal to the fujoshi who enjoy Boys' Love.

There are also cross-dressing butler cafes, where female staff dress up as butlers, instead of actual men.

Other variants 
In other stores, the outfits and even the setting itself change. In school-themed cafes, for example, customers are referred to as senpai instead of Master or Mistress. Inside, regular tables are replaced by school desks and even the menu is served in trays reminiscent of the ones used in Japanese schools. Other themes include,  or  cafes/izakaya.

Cat-maid café 
Another sub-genre of maid cafe is the cat-maid cafe. Waitresses in these cafes will wear cat ears and tails and often make puns by meowing or punctuate sentences with a meow. Additionally, food will often be prepared to resemble cats or kittens.

Tsundere café 
These cafes have all the characteristics of a typical maid cafe with the addition of a personality theme. The theme has every maid assume a "tsundere" personality archetype wherein the servers in these cafes will often act rude or indifferent to customers. Additionally, some cafes like this allow for the patron to order special service which usually comes in some form of abuse like getting flicked in the forehead.

North America 
One maid cafe which opened in the west was the "i maid cafe" located in Scarborough, Ontario, and was featured in CBC's newsmagazine, The Hour. The cafe was closed in November 2007 because management failed to pay back rent.

In December 2007, Royal-T opened in Culver City, California, and was featured in several magazines, such as Elle and the Los Angeles Times. It was a combination of maid cafe, store, and art gallery. The restaurant closed after five years.

In September 2008, a Japanese franchise Crepe House Uni opened in Davis, California, but closed in 2010. Their workers wore maid uniforms, but it was not exactly a maid cafe.

In 2012 a maid cafe called "Chou Anime" opened up in the Midtown district of Detroit, Michigan. Information about the cafe could be seen on their website. Chou Anime was officially closed on Saturday, September 22, 2012, due to not seeing a steady flow of customers.

On August 18, 2013, "Maid Cafe NY" opened in New York City, New York. While also serving food, the store also offered various cosplay items for sale and live music entertainment. It closed in March 2015 due to no longer being able to stay in its Chinatown location and being unable to find a new one.

See also

 Maid in Akihabara, a short Japanese television drama
 Cosplay
 No-pan kissa

References

External links
 Maid cafe database 
 Hang Out In Nerd Paradise (With Maids!) – article on the Kotaku website
 Maid cafe Chou Anime brings Japanese pop culture to Midtown – article in The Detroit News
 http://www.moe-navi.jp/

Restaurant
Japanese culture
Japanese popular culture
Restaurants in Japan
Types of coffeehouses and cafés
Theme restaurants
Akihabara
Restaurants by type